Oasis Academy Wintringham is a secondary school (academy) on Weelsby Avenue in Grimsby, North East Lincolnshire, England. It is just off the A16 Peaks Parkway just south-west of the A46 crossroads next to the Lisle Marsden CE Primary School in Wellow and on the Grimsby-Cleethorpes boundary (the A16). The school was originally a religious foundation, and lies in the ecclesiastical parish of St Augustine of Hippo.

History
The school began in 1933 as Wintringham Secondary School on Eleanor Street.

Grammar school
The old grammar school buildings in Weelsby Avenue, Grimsby, were opened in 1953  as Wintringham Grammar School to replace a former school on Eleanor Street, Grimsby. The school was first divided into a boys' and girls' grammar school (they are both now demolished) on a combined site, with around 750 boys and a similar number of girls. The boys' school was on the Weelsby Avenue side of the site, and the girls' school was on the west side of the site, accessed via Park Avenue next to the tennis courts. The Highfields School which was to the north, is now the Lisle Marsden CE primary school. The school was administered by the County Borough of Grimsby Education Committee, from its offices on Eleanor Street. 

The headmaster of the boys' school in the 1950s was Ronald Gill. The headmistress of the girls' school until the late 1970s was Dorothy Dean. The schools remained separate up to 1969 when a mixed 6th form became the start of a gradual merger. They shared the playing field and some out-of-school activities. The sixth form block was built between the two sites: the co-educational sixth form numbered 200. From the late 1960s until 1974, it was administered (but not taught) as the single-entity Grimsby Wintringham Grammar School for ages 11 to 18. The former Boys' School became the Upper School, and the former Girls' School became the Lower School.  Music lessons were held in Highfield House, an old Victorian detached house on the school property.

Comprehensive

It became the comprehensive Wintringham School in September 1974. The school name comes from the Wintringham family, specifically John Wintringham. Also in 1974, administration was transferred over the Humber to Beverley, and Humberside County Council, in the Grimsby Division. The school became a comprehensive (incrementally) year by year, with the first all-ability year composed of ten forms. It also became an upper school with ages 12–18, as Grimsby became part of the three tier system.

In the late 1980s, headmaster Keith Bardgett switched the school from streaming to mixed-ability classes, the change starting with the new intake of pupils in September 1988. A restricted form of streaming remained, limited to specific subjects, notably Mathematics and foreign languages. From September 1990, the naming convention for classes switched to the modern nomenclature still in use today. At the same time, a re-organisation of local education saw Wintringham give up its 6th Form and take in new pupils a year earlier than was previously the case. This meant that the 2nd - 6th forms were replaced with Years 7 - 11.

In 1996, administration passed back to Grimsby under North East Lincolnshire.

Oasis Academy Wintringham 
In September 2007, the school adopted Academy status under the Oasis Community Learning multi-academy trust. The former schools' buildings were to be demolished and replaced with a single newbuild costing of £25 million. The construction started on 30 August 2007, being undertaken by Clugston Construction of Scunthorpe who finished in January 2009. The start of the construction work was marked by a ceremony where Steve Chalke of Oasis and pupils from the new Academy drove the first spades into the ground.  The Academy transferred across to the new buildings in February 2009. 

There are also community facilities. The sports hall is sponsored by  Stagecoach. The Dean Suite is named in memory of Dorothy Dean, the headteacher of the school from 1953 to 1975.

The Ofsted Visit in 2016 identified significant difficulties. An interim Executive Principal was brought in from the neighbouring Oasis Academy Immingham. In October 2015 the Oasis Trust appointed an interim executive board to replace the governing body. 

Pupil outcomes reached a nadir in 2016. In 2018, Ofsted declared this a 'good' school.

Description
In its current incarnation the Wintringham academy is a smaller than average sized 11-16 mixed non-selective secondary school with more boys than girls, within a school system that retains selection.  Half the students are disadvantaged and are supported through the pupil premium. Pupil premium is additional funding given for pupils who are known to be eligible for free school meal or looked after children.  There are few pupils who speak English as an additional language: the vast majority are of White British heritage while the proportion of pupils who have special educational needs support is above average, but those with a statement remains average.

Curriculum
Virtually all maintained schools and academies follow the National Curriculum, and their success is judged on how well they succeed in delivering a 'broad and balanced curriculum'. Schools endeavour to get all students to achieve the English Baccalaureate qualification - this must include core subjects a modern or ancient foreign language, and either history or geography. 

The academy operates a three-year, Key Stage 3 where all the core National Curriculum subjects are taught. This builds on the skills, knowledge and understanding gained at primary school, and introduces youngsters who are starting from a lower than average base to wider, robust and challenging programmes of study needed to gain qualifications at Key Stage 4  French is the Modern Language offered. Year 9 is a transition year where one of the students Key Stage 4 options is started. The school places the students into one of three pathways, which leads to guided options. At the end of Year 9 students make their final exam choices.

At Key Stage 4 the focus is on the English Baccalaureate, and there are daily maths, English and science lessons- plus three guided options.

Alumni

Wintringham School
 Julie Peasgood, actress, TV presenter, author
 Thomas Turgoose, actor

Grimsby Wintringham Boys' Grammar School
 Sir Arthur Binns, chief education officer until 1966 for Lancashire; his daughter married Sir Michael Bruce, 11th Baronet
 Prof George Edward Briggs FRS, Professor of Botany at the University of Cambridge from 1948 to 1960
 John Edward Brown, Bishop of Cyprus and the Gulf 1987-96
 Dennis Brown, Professor of Medicine, Harvard Medical School and Massachusetts General Hospital
 Ian Cawsey, former Labour MP for Brigg and Goole
 Quentin Cooper, Radio 4 science presenter
 Derek Gladwin, Baron Gladwin of Clee, trade unionist and life peer
 Sir William Harpham OBE CMG, UK Ambassador to Bulgaria from 1964 to 1966
 Richard Markham, concert pianist
 Duncan McKenzie, footballer
 Adrian Royle, runner
 John Sellars CBE, Chief Executive from 1983 to 1994 of the Business and Technology Education Council (BTEC)
 David Tarttelin, artist
 Prof Michael Tilmouth, musicologist
 Professor C. Rowel Twidale PhD, School of Earth and Environmental Sciences, Geology and Geophysics, University of Adelaide, South Australia
 Andrew Whiten, Professor of Evolutionary and Developmental Psychology at the University of St Andrews, winner of the 2007 Rivers Memorial Medal of the Royal Anthropological Institute of Great Britain and Ireland
 Prof Peter Worsley, former Professor of Geography from 1983-89 at the University of Nottingham, father of Lucy Worsley
 Patrick Wymark (born Patrick Carl Cheeseman), Shakespearian and film actor (portrayed AVM Trafford Leigh-Mallory in the 1969 film Battle of Britain)

Grimsby Wintringham Girls' Grammar School
 Dame Janet Baker CH, mezzo-soprano opera singer
 Sheila Foulkes, Member of the Legislative Council, Parliament of Western Australia 2005-2009
 Patricia Hodge, actor
 Prof Jill Rubery, Professor of Contemporary Politics at the University of Manchester

Wintringham Secondary School
 Norma Procter, contralto opera singer

See also
 Oasis Academy Immingham (formerly The Immingham School)

References

External links
 Oasis Academy Wintringham

Schools in Grimsby
Educational institutions established in 1933
Academies in the Borough of North East Lincolnshire
Secondary schools in the Borough of North East Lincolnshire
1933 establishments in England
Wintringham